Phalaris paradoxa is a species of grass in genus Phalaris. Common names include awned canary-grass and hood canarygrass.

The spikelets are very different from those of other members of this genus.  The spikelet glumes each have a hook.

It is native to Africa, Asia, and Europe, and it has been introduced widely. Its distribution within the United States includes Arizona, California, Hawaii, Louisiana, Maryland, New Jersey, Oregon, Pennsylvania, Washington.

References

External links
 USDA Plants Profile: Phalaris paradoxa
 Image: Phalaris paradoxa flowers
 Jepson Manual Treatment

paradoxa
Flora of Western Asia
Flora of Malta